Rik van IJzendoorn (born 22 August 1987) is a Dutch professional road racing cyclist and cyclocross racer, who last rode for UCI Professional Continental team . He competed at the 2017 Milan–San Remo where he finished in 190th position.

Rik is the brother of Dutch rider Eddy van IJzendoorn.

References

External links

Cycling Quotient: Martijn Verschoor

Team Novo Nordisk: Rik van IJzendoorn

1987 births
Living people
Dutch male cyclists
People from Neder-Betuwe
Cyclists from Gelderland
21st-century Dutch people